alpha-1 (α1) adrenergic receptors are G protein-coupled receptors (GPCRs) associated with the Gq heterotrimeric G protein. α1-adrenergic receptors are subdivided into three highly homologous subtypes, i.e., α1A-, α1B-, and α1D-adrenergic receptor subtypes. There is no α1C receptor. At one time, there was a subtype known as α1C, but it was found to be identical to the previously discovered α1A receptor subtype. To avoid confusion, naming was continued with the letter D. Catecholamines like norepinephrine (noradrenaline) and epinephrine (adrenaline) signal through the α1-adrenergic receptors in the central and peripheral nervous systems. The crystal structure of the α1B-adrenergic receptor subtype has been determined in complex with the inverse agonist (+)-cyclazosin.

Effects
The α1-adrenergic receptor has several general functions in common with the α2-adrenergic receptor, but also has specific effects of its own. α1-receptors primarily mediate smooth muscle contraction, but have important functions elsewhere as well.  The neurotransmitter norepinephrine has higher affinity for the α1 receptor than does the hormone adrenaline.

Smooth muscle
In smooth muscle cells of blood vessels the principal effect of activation of these receptors is vasoconstriction. Blood vessels with α1-adrenergic receptors are present in the skin, the sphincters of gastrointestinal system, kidney (renal artery) and brain. During the fight-or-flight response vasoconstriction results in decreased blood flow to these organs. This accounts for the pale appearance of the skin of an individual when frightened.

It also induces contraction of the internal urethral sphincter of the urinary bladder, although this effect is minor compared to the relaxing effect of β2-adrenergic receptors. In other words, the overall effect of sympathetic stimuli on the bladder is relaxation, in order to inhibit micturition upon anticipation of a stressful event. Other effects on smooth muscle are contraction in:
 Ureter
 Uterus (when pregnant): this is minor compared to the relaxing effects of the β2 receptor, agonists of which - notably albuterol/salbutamol - were formerly used to inhibit premature labor.
 Urethral sphincter
 Bronchioles (although minor to the relaxing effect of β2 receptor on bronchioles)
 Iris dilator muscle
 Seminal tract, resulting in ejaculation

Neuronal
Activation of α1-adrenergic receptors produces anorexia and partially mediates the efficacy of appetite suppressants like phenylpropanolamine and amphetamine in the treatment of obesity. Norepinephrine has been shown to decrease cellular excitability in all layers of the temporal cortex, including the primary auditory cortex. In particular, norepinephrine decreases glutamatergic excitatory postsynaptic potentials by the activation of α1-adrenergic receptors. Norepinephrine also stimulates serotonin release by binding α1-adrenergic receptors located on serotonergic neurons in the raphe.
α1-adrenergic receptor subtypes increase inhibition in the olfactory system, suggesting a synaptic mechanism for noradrenergic modulation of olfactory driven behaviors.

Other

 Both positive and negative inotropic effects on heart muscle
 Secretion from salivary gland
 Increase salivary potassium levels
 Glycogenolysis and gluconeogenesis in liver.
 Secretion from sweat glands
 Contraction of the urinary bladder urothelium and lamina propria  
 Na+ reabsorption from kidney
 Stimulate proximal tubule NHE3
 Stimulate proximal tubule basolateral Na-K ATPase
 Activate mitogenic responses and regulate growth and proliferation of many cells
 Involved in the detection of mechanical feedback on the hypoglossal motor neurons which allow a long-term facilitation in respiration in response to repeated apneas.

Signaling cascade
α1-Adrenergic receptors are members of the G protein-coupled receptor superfamily. Upon activation, a heterotrimeric G protein, Gq, activates phospholipase C (PLC), which causes phosphatidylinositol to be transformed into inositol trisphosphate (IP3) and diacylglycerol (DAG). While DAG stays near the membrane, IP3 diffuses into the cytosol and to find the IP3 receptor on the endoplasmic reticulum, triggering calcium release from the stores. This triggers further effects, primarily through the activation of an enzyme Protein Kinase C. This enzyme, as a kinase, functions by phosphorylation of other enzymes causing their activation, or by phosphorylation of certain channels leading to the increase or decrease of electrolyte transfer in or out of the cell.

Activity during exercise
During exercise, α1-adrenergic receptors in active muscles are attenuated in an exercise intensity-dependent manner, allowing the β2-adrenergic receptors which mediate vasodilation to dominate. In contrast to α2-adrenergic receptors, α1-adrenergic-receptors in the arterial vasculature of skeletal muscle are more resistant to inhibition, and attenuation of α1-adrenergic-receptor-mediated vasoconstriction only occurs during heavy exercise.

Note that only active muscle α1-adrenergic receptors will be blocked. Resting muscle will not have its α1-adrenergic receptors blocked, and hence the overall effect will be α1-adrenergic-mediated vasoconstriction.

Ligands

 Agonists
 Cirazoline (vasoconstrictor)
 Methoxamine (vasoconstrictor)
 Synephrine (mild vasoconstrictor)
 Etilefrine (antihypotensive)
 Metaraminol (antihypotensive)
 Midodrine (antihypotensive)
 Naphazoline (decongestant)
 Norepinephrine (vasoconstrictor)
 Oxymetazoline (decongestant)
 Phenylephrine (decongestant)
 Pseudoephedrine (decongestant)
 Tetrahydrozoline (decongestant)
 Xylometazoline (decongestant)
Sdz-nvi-085 [104195-17-7].

 Antagonists
 Acepromazine (antipsychotic, secondary mechanism)
 Alfuzosin (used in benign prostatic hyperplasia)
 Arotinolol
 Carvedilol (used in congestive heart failure; it is a non-selective beta blocker)
 Chlorpromazine (antipsychotic and powerful antihypertensive)
 Doxazosin (used in hypertension and benign prostatic hyperplasia)
 Indoramin
 Labetalol (used in hypertension; it is a mixed alpha/beta adrenergic antagonist)
 Moxisylyte
 Phenoxybenzamine
 Phentolamine (used in hypertensive emergencies; it is a nonselective alpha-antagonist)
 Prazosin (used in hypertension)
 Quetiapine
 Risperidone
 Silodosin
 Tamsulosin (used in benign prostatic hyperplasia)
 Terazosin
 Tiamenidine
 Tolazoline
 Trazodone
 Trimazosin
 Urapidil

Various heterocyclic antidepressants and antipsychotics are α1-adrenergic receptor antagonists as well. This action is generally undesirable in such agents and mediates side effects like orthostatic hypotension, and headaches due to excessive vasodilation.

See also 
 Adrenergic receptor

References

External links 
 

Adrenergic receptors